St James' Church, Islington, is a parish church in the inner London borough of Islington. It is located on Prebend Street between Essex Road and the New North Road. The parish is bounded by Essex Road between the New North Road and Upper Street, Upper Street to The Angel, Islington, City Road to Wharf Road, Wharf Road to the Regent's Canal, and the Regent's Canal to the New North Road.

History
The Clothworkers' Company of the City of London built St James' Church, Islington to serve the surrounding Packington housing estate. The church was consecrated in 1875 and the surrounding estate had been built by around 1850. The land on which the church and the rest of the estate were built originally belonged to St Paul's Cathedral (hence St Paul's Street, Mary Street, Bishop's Street, Canon Street, Prebend Street and so on) but these 'prebends' were stripped from the cathedral at the time of the Reformation and were sold to the Clothworkers' Company, which shortly afterwards were bequeathed an additional 60 acres of land by Dame Ann Packington on her death in 1563, which had been used for archery practice.  The Clothworkers paid £8,400 for the construction of the church, Lady Burdett-Coutts paid for a set of bells and individual members of the Clothworkers paid for the stained glass including members of the Heysham Wood family. The full name for the church is St James' with St Peter and St Philip, Islington as the parish includes that of the former St Phillip's the Evangelist, Arlington Square, which was consecrated in 1857 but which was demolished in 1954 after a falling congregation made it redundant and that of St Peter which was located in Devonia Road but which was closed in 1981

The church was built as the successor to Lambe's Chapel, formerly St James in the Wall, in Monkswell Street in the City of London, which had been built as a hermitage during the reign of King Henry III. William Lambe acquired St James in the Wall on 30 March 1543, became Master of the Company of Clothworkers in 1569 and in 1574 bequeathed the chapel to the Clothworkers' Company. Almshouses attached to the original Lambe's Chapel were pulled down in 1825 and replacements built on the Clothworkers Estate in Islington. In 1872 Lambe's Chapel itself was demolished and its successor, St James' Church, Islington, was built adjacent to the new almshouses, although the original chapel's crypt was moved to All Hallows Staining.

The church was designed by the Clothworkers' Company's architect, F. W. Porter. It is built in the style of 13th century French gothic, and Pevsner's architectural guide notes the "Good E[ast] window by Lavers & Baraud" at St James' Church, Islington,  and that the window in the north chapel contains "four Flemish roundels, from Lambe's Chapel". Today the west wall of St James' Church, Islington contains a half figure of William Lambe, dated 1612, after whom Lambe's chapel was named. The British Museum has a watercolour sketch dated 15 May 1851 of the same half figure of William Lambe from when it was located in the "Chapel of the Clothworkers' Almshouses, Cripplegate". 

On 14 December 2018 the church was used to film a short sequel to Four Weddings and a Funeral for Comic Relief which was aired on BBC Television in the UK on Red Nose Day, Friday 15 March 2019. The piece featured, amongst others, Rowan Atkinson, Hugh Grant, Lily James and Kristin Scott-Thomas.

On 16 December 2018 the church was visited by a 'mystery worshipper' from the Ship of Fools website who gave the church a broadly positive write-up, rating the sermon 8/10 and the likelihood of a making a return visit 7/10.

Present day
Today the Islington Proms organisation holds an annual series of mainly classical concerts exclusively at St James' Church, Islington.

On Mondays the church provides a soup and sandwich lunch for members of the street community in its church hall.

The church is in the Islington deanery in the archdeaconery of Hackney in the Stepney area of the Diocese of London.

The congregation of St James' Church, Islington is extremely diverse, reflecting the community in which it is based. A part of the Church of England, the style of worship is 'modern catholic', with a balance of familiar and more contemporary hymns.

Gallery

References

Islington
19th-century Church of England church buildings
Diocese of London
Anglo-Catholic church buildings in the London Borough of Islington
Buildings and structures in Islington